Křižovatka is a municipality and village in Cheb District in the Karlovy Vary Region of the Czech Republic. It has about 300 inhabitants.

Administrative parts
The village of Nová Ves is an administrative part of Křižovatka.

References

Villages in Cheb District